The 2014–15 GMHL season was the ninth season of the Greater Metro Junior A Hockey League (GMHL). The twenty teams of the GMHL played 42-game schedules.

Starting in February 2015, the top teams of the league played down for the Russell Cup, emblematic of the grand championship of the GMHL. Since the GMHL is independent from Hockey Canada and the Canadian Junior Hockey League, this is where the GMHL's season ended.  The Temiscaming Titans defeated their division rival Seguin Huskies in the final series 4 games to 1 to win the Championship.

Changes 
Expansion granted to the Cambridge Bears of Cambridge, Ontario.
Lefroy Wave relocate to Markdale, Ontario and become Grey Highlands Bravehearts.
Expansion granted to the Tottenham Steam of Tottenham, Ontario.
Bobcaygeon Bucks leave league for CIHL.
Mattawa Voyageurs relocate to South River, Ontario and become Almaguin Spartans.
Expansion granted to the North York Renegades of Toronto, Ontario.
Bracebridge Phantoms change name to Bracebridge Blues.
Expansion granted to Niagara Whalers of Port Colborne, Ontario.
Expansion granted to Downsview Spitfires of Toronto, Ontario, begin play in 2015.
Powassan Eagles relocate to Parry Sound, Ontario and become Parry Sound Islanders.
Shelburne Red Wings change name to Shelburne Stars and takes season off to restructure.

Standings 
Note: GP = Games played; W = Wins; L = Losses; OTL = Overtime losses; SL = Shootout losses; GF = Goals for; GA = Goals against; PTS = Points; x = clinched playoff berth; y = clinched division title; z = clinched conference title

Teams listed on the official league website.

Standings listed on official league website.

2015 Russell Cup Playoffs
Elimination Qualifiers Rd 1
Cambridge Bears 3 - North York Renegades 2 
Orangeville Americans 6 - Bradford Bulls 5

Elimination Qualifiers Rd 2
Sturgeon Falls Lumberjacks 5 - Almaguin Spartans 4 
Knights of Meaford 3 - Bracebridge Blues 0 
Toronto Predators 5 - Cambridge Bears 3 
Alliston Coyotes 11 - Orangeville Americans 3

Divisional Round
Temiscaming Titans defeated Sturgeon Falls Lumberjacks 3-games-to-none
Seguin Huskies defeated Parry Sound Islanders 3-games-to-none 
South Muskoka Shield defeated Knights of Meaford 3-games-to-none 
Rama Aces defeated Grey Highlands Bravehearts 3-games-to-2 
Tottenham Steam defeated Alliston Coyotes 3-games-to-2 
Toronto Blue Ice Jets defeated Bradford Rattlers 3-games-to-2 
Toronto Attack defeated Toronto Predators 3-games-to-none 
Halton Ravens defeated Niagara Whalers 3-games-to-1

Quarter-final
Temiscaming Titans defeated Rama Aces 3-games-to-none 
Seguin Huskies defeated South Muskoka Shield 3-games-to-1 
Halton Ravens defeated Tottenham Steam 3-games-to-2 
Toronto Attack defeated Toronto Blue Ice Jets 3-games-to-none

Semi-final
Temiscaming Titans defeated Halton Ravens 4-games-to-3 
Seguin Huskies defeated Toronto Attack 4-games-to-none

Final
Temiscaming Titans defeated Seguin Huskies 4-games-to-1

Playoff results are listed on the official league website.

Scoring leaders 
Note: GP = Games played; G = Goals; A = Assists; Pts = Points; PIM = Penalty minutes

Leading goaltenders 
Note: GP = Games played; Mins = Minutes played; W = Wins; L = Losses: OTL = Overtime losses; SL = Shootout losses; GA = Goals Allowed; SO = Shutouts; GAA = Goals against average

Awards
Top Scorer: Ferdinando Colella (Tottenham)
Most Valuable Player: Shane Bennett (Halton)
Rookie of the Year: Zan Hobbs (Bradford Bulls)
Top Forward: Curtis Warren (Temiscaming)
Top Defenceman: Kevin Yandon (Toronto Blue Ice Jets)
Top Goaltender: Craig Wood (Temiscaming)
Top Defensive Forward: Brandon Case (Temiscaming)
Most Sportsmanlike Player: Mikko Lindbom (Bradford Rattlers)
Most Heart: Brad Ferrell (Orangeville)
Top Coach: Frank De Masi (South Muskoka)

See also 
 2014 in ice hockey
 2015 in ice hockey

References

External links 
 Official website of the Greater Metro Junior A Hockey League

GMHL
Greater Metro Junior A Hockey League seasons